Steins Creek, a stream or arroyo tributary to the San Simon River, that arises within an east–west running canyon, in Hidalgo County, New Mexico with its mouth in Cochise County, Arizona. This canyon provides the gap, called Stein's Pass, through which the railroad and Interstate 10 pass through the Peloncillo Mountains.

See also
 List of rivers of Arizona
 List of rivers of New Mexico

References

Rivers of Cochise County, Arizona
Rivers of Hidalgo County, New Mexico
Rivers of New Mexico
Rivers of Arizona